Hautlieu School, or simply Hautlieu, is a secondary school in Jersey which accepts students aged 14 and over. The school is owned and operated by the States of Jersey.

Overview
In 2012, the school had approximately 680 pupils.

During the academic year 2004/2005 the GCSE pass rate was 100%, at which 40% gained A* to A grades. At A level there was an 87% pass rate of which 79% obtained grades A-C. 
Admission into Hautlieu depends on the result of CAT, Cognitive Abilities Test, exams with a minimum result of 109, as well as the results of the PT, Progress Test, in English and Maths (PTE and PTM respectively) with a minimum result of 103 on both tests. It is, however, possible for determined students who have not achieved the necessary CAT or PT scores to appeal.

Over the years it has been suggested by politicians that Hautlieu should be converted to a sixth-form college and the 14+ system (which some regard as controversial) be abolished.

Admission criteria
Hautlieu differs from other state secondary schools in Jersey, in that students must meet specific criteria before being eligible for application to attend the school.

History
Construction of Hautlieu's first building began on the 18 April 1951 and was officially opened on the 5 April 1952, and was originally a boys' grammar school until the admission of its first female student in 1962.

Hautlieu's successful exam results have received positive reports from Her Majesty's Inspectors.

As of June 2003, Hautlieu no longer automatically accepts year 10 pupils. Students wishing to attend must take cognitive ability tests, and undergo teacher assessments.

Programs
A Confucius Institute at Hautlieu School opened circa 2017, the 1,000th such institution in the world.

Headteachers
Charles Brown – 1952–1977
Jack Worrall – 1977–1988
Brian Bullock – 1988–1996
Lesley Toms – 1996–2014
Nick Falle – 2014–present

See also

:Category:People educated at Hautlieu School
List of schools in Jersey

Further reading
 Confucius Classroom agreements with Hautlieu school (FOI) - Agreement

References

External links

 

Schools in Jersey
Secondary schools in the Channel Islands
Saint Saviour, Jersey